A coloratura soprano is a type of operatic soprano voice that specializes in music that is distinguished by agile runs, leaps and trills.

The term coloratura refers to the elaborate ornamentation of a melody, which is a typical component of the music written for this voice. Within the coloratura category, there are roles written specifically for lighter voices known as lyric coloraturas and others for larger voices known as dramatic coloraturas. Categories within a certain vocal range are determined by the size, weight and color of the voice. Coloratura is particularly found in vocal music and especially in operatic singing of the 18th and 19th centuries. The word coloratura means "coloring" in Italian, and derives from the Latin word colorare ("to color").

Lyric coloratura soprano
A very agile light voice with a high upper extension, capable of fast vocal coloratura. Lyric coloraturas have a range of approximately middle C (C4) to "high F" (F6). Such a soprano is sometimes referred to as a soprano leggero if her vocal timbre has a slightly warmer quality. The soprano leggero also typically does not go as high as other coloraturas, peaking at a "high E" (E6). Bel canto roles were typically written for this voice, and a wide variety of other composers have also written coloratura parts. Baroque music, early music and baroque opera also have many roles for this voice.

Lyric coloratura soprano roles
Source:

Dramatic coloratura soprano
A coloratura soprano with great flexibility in high-lying velocity passages, yet with great sustaining power comparable to that of a full spinto or dramatic soprano. Dramatic coloraturas have a range of approximately "low B" (B3) to "high F" (F6). Various dramatic coloratura roles have different vocal demands for the singer – for instance, the voice that can sing Abigail (Nabucco, Verdi) is unlikely to also sing Lucia (Lucia di Lammermoor, Donizetti), but a factor in common is that the voice must be able to convey dramatic intensity as well as flexibility. Roles written specifically for this kind of voice include the more dramatic Mozart and bel canto female roles and early Verdi. This is a rare vocal fach, as thick vocal cords are needed to produce the large, dramatic notes, which usually lessens the flexibility and acrobatic abilities of the voice.

Dramatic coloratura soprano roles
Source:

Soprano acuto sfogato
In rare instances, some coloratura sopranos are able to sing in altissimo above high F (F6). This type of  singer is sometimes referred to as a soprano acuto sfogato.

Although both lyric and dramatic coloraturas can be acuto sfogato sopranos, the primary attribute of the acuto sfogato soprano is an upper extension above F6. Some pedagogues refer to these extreme high notes as the whistle register. 

Very few composers have ever written operatic roles for this voice type with actual notes scored above high F, so these singers typically display these extreme high notes through the use of interpolation in some of the operatic roles already cited above or in concert works. Examples of works that include G6 are the concert aria "Popoli di Tessaglia!"" by Mozart, Esclarmonde by Massenet, and Postcard from Morocco by Dominick Argento. Thomas Adès composed a high A (A6) for the character of Leticia Meynar in The Exterminating Angel.

The soprano acuto sfogato is sometimes confused with the soprano sfogato, a singer (often mezzo-soprano) capable, by sheer industry or natural talent, of extending her upper range to encompass some of the coloratura soprano tessitura, though not the highest range above high F.

See also

Lyric soprano
Dramatic soprano
Soubrette

References
Notes

Cited sources

Other sources

Voice types
Italian opera terminology
 

fr:Soprano#Soprano léger